Jazzmatazz is a series of hip hop and jazz recordings from American rapper Guru.

In a 2009 interview he reflected, "Back around '93—when I first came up with the Jazzmatazz concept—I was noticing how a lot of cats were digging in the crates and sampling jazz breaks to make hip hop records. But while I thought that was cool, I wanted to take it to the next level and actually create a new genre by getting the actual dudes we were sampling into the studio to jam over hip hop beats with some of the top vocalists of the time. You know, the whole thing was experimental, but I knew it was an idea that would spawn some historic music."

Some of those involved in the creation of the work have included N'Dea Davenport, Carleen Anderson, Courtney Pine, Branford Marsalis, Roy Ayers, Donald Byrd, Lonnie Liston Smith, MC Solaar, Dee C Lee and Chaka Khan.

Albums
 Guru's Jazzmatazz, Vol. 1, 1993
 Guru's Jazzmatazz, Vol. 2: The New Reality, 1995
 Guru's Jazzmatazz, Vol. 3: Streetsoul, 2000
 Guru's Jazzmatazz, Vol. 4: The Hip Hop Jazz Messenger: Back to the Future, 2007
 Guru's Jazzmatazz: The Timebomb Back to the Future Mixtape, 2007
 The Best of Guru's Jazzmatazz, 2008

References

Album series